Marquess Ai of Han (died 374 BC), ancestral name Jì (姬), clan name Hán (韩), personal name unknown, was the ruler of the State of Han between 376 BC and until his death in 374 BC. He was the son of Marquess Wen of Han.

In 376 BC, Han, Wei, and Zhao deposed Duke Jing of Jin. They then divided his land, marking the end of Jin state.

The following year, after two unsuccessful invasions, Han annexed Zheng. It then moved the capital to Xinzheng (a city in Henan). At this time, its territory contains south-eastern part of Shanxi and central part of Henan.

According to "Zizhi Tongjian", Marquess Ai appointed Gui Han to be the Prime Minister, but was much closer to Minister Sui Yan. They were archenemies of each other. In 374 BC, Minister Han plotted to assassinate Yan at the court. Han walked to Ai, who then hugged him. As a result, both were killed by the assassin.

However, "Records of the Grand Historian" tells a different story: Ai was murdered by Han and Yan, and it was not an accident.

The succession then passed to Marquess Gong, son of Ai. He later moved the capital back to Yangzhai.

References

374 BC deaths
Zhou dynasty nobility
Monarchs of Han (state)
Year of birth unknown